The  is a professional wrestling championship contested for in the Japanese professional wrestling promotion Tenryu Project. The title was established in 1995 in Wrestle Association R (WAR).

There have been a total of 24 reigns shared between 17 different champions and two vacancies. The current champion is Hikaru Sato who is in his first reign.

Title history

Inaugural championship tournament
On March 26, 1995, an eight-man single elimination tournament was held on the second day of the Wrestle Association R (WAR) event Battle Angel. The tournament saw Gedo defeat Lionheart in the finals to become the inaugural champion.

The title was part of New Japan Pro-Wrestling's short-lived J-Crown Championship in 1996 and 1997. In late 2006, the title briefly moved to Dragon Gate where Masaaki Mochizuki beat Gedo in a decision match on January 26, 2007 to determine the final champion, and then retired the title.

Revivals
The title was revived in April 2010, for Genichiro Tenryu's Tenryu Project promotion until being again retired in 2013 after the closure of the promotion. The championship was once again reactivated after Tenryu Project reopened in 2020. On May 25 and June 6, an eight-man single elimination tournament was held to crown a new champion. The tournament saw Hub defeat Kengo in the finals.

Reigns

Combined reigns

References

External links
Wrestling-Titles.com

Junior heavyweight wrestling championships
WAR (wrestling promotion) championships
Dragon Gate (wrestling) championships
Tenryu Project championships